Bara District is one of the seventy–seven districts of Nepal, located in the western part of the Madhesh Province. The district is third richest district in Nepal after Kathmandu and Morang with  3.3% share of total GDP of Nepal and highest per capita income in Madhesh province. Kalaiya serves as the district's headquarter. Bakaiya, Jamuniya, Pasaha, Dudhaura and Bangari are the main rivers of Bara. The main languages spoken in the district are Bhojpuri, Bajjika, Tharu and Nepali.

History
Simraungadh is major part of Bara district. It is a historical place in Nepal and famous for agricultural products. Here people grow wheat, maize, and various green vegetables (cauliflower, tomato, banana (raw), beetroot, bitter gourd, bottle gourd, brinjal, cabbage, carrot, cauliflower, chilli (green), chilli (dry red), coriander leaves, cucumber, potato and so on).

Bara district is famous for the Gadhimai Temple, particularly as every five years it celebrates the Gadhimai Mela. This festival has historically been celebrated every 5 years by sacrificing animals. In the future animal sacrifice will no longer occur, as temple authorities have decided to convert the festival into a "momentous celebration of life."

Geography and climate

The district is surrounded by Parsa district in the west, Rautahat district in the east, Makwanpur district of Bagmati province in the north and Indian state of Bihar in the south.

Demographics
At the time of the 2011 Nepal census, Bara District had a population of 687,708. Of these, 72.2% spoke Bhojpuri, 9.5% Nepali, 7.5% Tharu, 3.8% Maithili, 3.6% Tamang, 1.7% Urdu, 0.4% Magar, 0.4% Newar, 0.1% Gurung, 0.1% Hindi, 0.1% Rai, 0.1% Uranw/Urau, 0.1% Yakkha and 0.1% other languages as their first language.

In terms of ethnicity/caste, 13.1% were Musalman, 10.5% Tharu, 10.5% Yadav, 4.8% Kanu, 4.5% Koiri/Kushwaha, 4.4% Chamar/Harijan/Ram, 4.3% Hill Brahmin, 4.1% Teli, 4.0% Tamang, 3.9% Kurmi, 3.1% Dusadh/Paswan/Pasi, 3.0% Kalwar, 2.9% Dhanuk, 2.7% Chhetri, 2.5% Mallaha, 1.6% Bin, 1.5% Kumhar, 1.4% Musahar, 1.4% Nuniya, 1.2% Dhobi, 1.2% Hajam/Thakur, 1.1% Lohar, 1.1% Sonar, 1.0% Magar, 0.9% Tatma/Tatwa, 0.8% Baraee, 0.8% Newar, 0.7% Kathabaniyan, 0.7% Sanyasi/Dasnami, 0.5% Terai Brahmin, 0.5% Danuwar, 0.5% Kumal, 0.5% other Terai, 0.4% Kami, 0.4% Rajput, 0.2% Badhaee, 0.2% Dhunia, 0.2% Gaderi/Bhedihar, 0.2% Kahar, 0.2% Kayastha, 0.2% Majhi, 0.2% Mali, 0.2% Rai, 0.2% Yakkha, 0.1% Bantar/Sardar, 0.1% Bengali, 0.1% other Dalit, 0.1% Damai/Dholi, 0.1% Dom, 0.1% Gurung, 0.1% Jhangad/Dhagar, 0.1% Kewat, 0.1% Marwadi, 0.1% Natuwa, 0.1% Rajbhar, 0.1% Sarki, 0.1% Thakuri and 0.1% others.

In terms of religion, 81.7% were Hindu, 13.0% Muslim, 4.5% Buddhist, 0.2% Christian, 0.2% Kirati, 0.1% Prakriti and 0.3% others.

In terms of literacy, 51.8% could read and write, 3.0% could only read and 45.1% could neither read nor write. 

According to the preliminary 2021 census, Bara district has a total population of 743,975. The population according to 2011 census was 687,708. Between 2011 and 2021, the population growth rate was 0.75%, the 32nd highest in the country. There are 112,329 households in the districts and 134,390 families in this district. The population density is 625 people per sq. kilometers and the average family size is 5.54.

The gender ratio of the district is 104.51 with 380,192 males and 363,783 females.

Administration
The district consists of two sub– metropolitan cities five urban municipalities and nine rural municipalities. These are as follows: 
Kalaiya Sub– Metropolitan City
Jeetpur Simara Sub– Metropolitan City
Kolhabi Municipality
Nijgadh Municipality
Mahagadhimai Municipality
Simraungadh Municipality
Pacharauta Municipality
Pheta Rural Municipality
Bishrampur Rural Municipality
Prasauni Rural Municipality
Adarsh Kotwal Rural Municipality
Karaiyamai Rural Municipality
Devtal Rural Municipality
Parwanipur Rural Municipality
Baragadhi Rural Municipality
Suwarna Rural Municipality

Former Municipalities and Village Development Committees 

Prior to the restructuring of the district, Bara consisted of the following municipalities and Village development committees:

Education
Symbiosis Institute of Management (SIM) is situated in district headquarter, Kalaiya which is committed for quality education in Commerce and Education.

Notable people  

 Laxman Lal Karna – Senior leader of DSP, N, former Minister for Labour and Employment and Member of House of Representatives
 Umakanta Chaudhary – Deputy General Secretary of Nepali Congress and former Minister for Labour and Employment
 Mukunda Neupane – Senior leader of CPN (Unified Socialist) and Member of House of Representatives
 Farmullah Mansoor – Deputy General Secretary of Nepali Congress and former Minister for Labour and Employment
 Ram Krishna Dhakal – Singer and actor

References

External links

 
Districts of Nepal established during Rana regime or before
Districts of Madhesh Province